The system of ancient Egyptian numerals was used in Ancient Egypt from around 3000 BCE until the early first millennium CE. It was a system of numeration based on multiples of ten, often rounded off to the higher power, written in hieroglyphs. The Egyptians had no concept of a place-valued system such as the decimal system. The hieratic form of numerals stressed an exact finite series notation, ciphered one-to-one onto the Egyptian alphabet.

Digits and numbers
The following hieroglyphs were used to denote powers of ten:

Multiples of these values were expressed by repeating the symbol as many times as needed. For instance, a stone carving from Karnak shows the number 4,622 as:

Egyptian hieroglyphs could be written in both directions (and even vertically). In this example the symbols decrease in value from top to bottom and from left to right. On the original stone carving, it is right-to-left, and the signs are thus reversed.

Zero and negative numbers

By 1740 BCE, the Egyptians had a symbol for zero in accounting texts. The symbol nfr (𓄤), meaning beautiful, was also used to indicate the base level in drawings of tombs and pyramids and distances were measured relative to the base line as being above or below this line.

Fractions

The hieroglyph indicating a fraction looked like a mouth, which meant "part":

Fractions were written with this fractional solidus, i.e., the numerator 1, and the positive denominator below. Thus,  was written as:

If the denominator became too large, the "mouth" was just placed over the beginning of the "denominator":

Addition and subtraction
For plus and minus signs, the hieroglyphs D54-and-D55 (D54, D55) were used: if the feet pointed into the direction of  writing, it signified addition, otherwise subtraction.

Written numbers
As with most modern day languages, the ancient Egyptian language could also write out numerals as words phonetically, just like one can write thirty instead of "30" in English. The word (thirty), for instance, was written as

while the numeral (30) was

This was, however, uncommon for most numbers other than one and two and the signs were used most of the time.

Hieratic numerals
As administrative and accounting texts were written on papyrus or  ostraca,  rather than being carved into hard stone (as were hieroglyphic texts), the vast majority of texts employing the Egyptian numeral system utilize the hieratic script. Instances of numerals written in hieratic can be found as far back as the Early Dynastic Period. The Old Kingdom Abusir Papyri are a particularly important corpus of texts that utilize hieratic numerals.

Boyer proved 50 years ago that hieratic script used a different numeral system, using individual signs for the numbers 1 to 9, multiples of 10 from 10 to 90, the hundreds from 100 to 900, and the thousands from 1000 to 9000.  A large number like 9999 could thus be written with only four signs—combining the signs for 9000, 900, 90, and 9—as opposed to 36 hieroglyphs. Boyer saw the new hieratic numerals as ciphered, mapping one number onto one Egyptian letter for the first time in human history. Greeks adopted the new system, mapping their counting  numbers onto two of their alphabets, the Doric and Ionian.

In the oldest hieratic texts the individual numerals were clearly written in a ciphered relationship to the Egyptian alphabet. But during the Old Kingdom a series of standardized writings had developed for sign-groups containing more than one numeral, repeated as Roman numerals practiced. However, repetition of the same numeral for each place-value was not allowed in the hieratic script. As the hieratic writing system developed over time, these sign-groups were further simplified for quick writing; this process continued into Demotic, as well.

Two famous mathematical papyri using hieratic script are the Moscow Mathematical Papyrus and the Rhind Mathematical Papyrus.

Egyptian words for numbers
The following table shows the reconstructed Middle Egyptian forms of the numerals (which are indicated by a preceding asterisk), the transliteration of the hieroglyphs used to write them, and finally the Coptic numerals which descended from them and which give Egyptologists clues as to the vocalism of the original Egyptian numbers. A breve (˘) in some reconstructed forms indicates a short vowel whose quality remains uncertain; the letter 'e' represents a vowel that was originally u or i (exact quality uncertain) but became e by Late Egyptian.

See also
Egyptian language
Egyptian mathematics

References

Bibliography
Allen, James Paul (2000). Middle Egyptian: An Introduction to the Language and Culture of Hieroglyphs. Cambridge: Cambridge University Press. Numerals discussed in §§9.1–9.6.
Gardiner, Alan Henderson (1957). Egyptian Grammar; Being an Introduction to the Study of Hieroglyphs. 3rd ed. Oxford: Griffith Institute. For numerals, see §§259–266.
Goedicke, Hans (1988). Old Hieratic Paleography. Baltimore: Halgo, Inc.
Möller, Georg (1927). Hieratische Paläographie: Die Ägyptische Buchschrift in ihrer Entwicklung von der Fünften Dynastie bis zur römischen Kaiserzeit. 3 vols. 2nd ed. Leipzig: J. C. Hinrichs Schen Buchhandlungen. (Reprinted Osnabrück: Otto Zeller Verlag, 1965)

External links

Egyptian Math History

Egyptian hieroglyphs
Numeral systems
Numerals
Egyptian mathematics